Martinus Wouter "Martin" Koolhoven (born 25 April 1969) is a Dutch film director and screenwriter. Internationally he is most known for Schnitzel Paradise (2005), Winter in Wartime (2008) and Brimstone (2016), which was his first film in English. It was released in 2017, after it premiered in the competition of the Venice Film Festival in 2016.

Early life and education 
Martin Koolhoven was born on 25 April 1969 in The Hague in the Netherlands. Koolhoven went to the Dutch Film Academy (in Amsterdam) and graduated in 1996 as a screenwriter and director.

Career 
His first film was a 53-minute television film named Duister Licht ("Dark Light").

His second film Suzy Q featured actress Carice van Houten, who Koolhoven worked with several times in the films to come. It was also the feature debut of actor Michiel Huisman.

His first (Dutch) cinematic release was AmnesiA (2001), which also got a small release in New York City.

In 2004, Koolhoven was one of the New Faces In European Cinema as presented by Pedro Almodovar at the AFI festival (Hollywood).

In 2005 Koolhoven directed Schnitzel Paradise. The film was shown at many international film festivals, including the Berlin Film Festival and the Karlovy Vary Film Festival where it was part of the Variety Critic's choice. In the same year Koolhoven released Bonkers, a children's movie.

In 2008 Koolhoven made Oorlogswinter (Winter in Wartime), a Dutch movie based on the novel by the same name, written by Jan Terlouw. The movie was the Dutch entry for the Academy Awards but failed to get nominated. The movie was distributed in the United States by Sony Classics and was sold to about 25 other countries.

In 2010, Koolhoven started his own production company, together with producer Els Vandevorst, called N279 Entertainment that produced several movies. His first production for N279 Entertainment as a director was the western named Brimstone. It premiered at the 73rd Venice International Film Festival in 2016 and became Koolhoven's fifth consecutive hit film in The Netherlands.

In 2020, Koolhoven received the Silver Rose, an award given annually to a person or institution that is or has been of great significance to the Dutch film world.

In 2022 Koolhoven was presented with the Rutger Hauer Award, which is given annually to a person or an institution that has made an important contribution to the development and promotion of young film talent in the Netherlands.

Koolhoven has said to be working on a noir thriller, set in Jakarta, 1946.

Filmography

Films
 Chess (1993) – short film
 KOEKOEK! (1995) – short film
 De Orde Der Dingen (1996) – short film
 Duister licht (1997) – TV film
 Suzy Q (1999) – TV film
 AmnesiA (2001)
 De grot (2001)
 South (2004)
 Schnitzel Paradise (2005)
 Knetter (2005)
 'n Beetje Verliefd (2006)
 Winter in Wartime (2008)
 Brimstone (2016)

TV series
 Koefnoen (2007) – western and Ingmar Bergman parodies
 De kijk van Koolhoven (2018-now) – Dutch TV series in which Koolhoven takes a look at his favorite genres and their movies.

References

External links

 
 

1969 births
Dutch film directors
Dutch screenwriters
Dutch male screenwriters
Golden Calf winners
Living people
Mass media people from The Hague